The Lizzie Garrard House is a historic house on North Cypress Street in Beebe, Arkansas.  It is a -story wood-frame structure, with a gable-on-hip roof that has a forward-projecting gable section.  The gable end is finished in decorative cut shingles, with bargeboard along the rake edges.  A porch wraps across the front, with turned posts and balusters, and a delicate spindlework valance.  Built about 1906, it is a good local example of Folk Victorian architecture.

The house was listed on the National Register of Historic Places in 1991.

See also
National Register of Historic Places listings in White County, Arkansas

References

Houses on the National Register of Historic Places in Arkansas
Houses completed in 1906
Houses in White County, Arkansas
National Register of Historic Places in White County, Arkansas
Buildings and structures in Beebe, Arkansas
1906 establishments in Arkansas